Sharafabad may refer to:

Bahadurgarh, India
Sharafabad, Ardabil, Iran
Sharafabad, East Azerbaijan, Iran
Sharafabad, Fars, Iran
Sharafabad, Kerman, Iran
Sharafabad, Kermanshah, Iran
Sharafabad, Lorestan, Iran
Sharafabad, Mazandaran, Iran
Sharafabad, Semnan, Iran
Sharafabad, Yazd, Iran
Sharafabad-e Bala, Iran
Sharafabad-e Mastufi, Iran
Sharafabad-e Pain, Iran

See also
Sharifabad (disambiguation)